Moshe ben Yonatan Galante (1621 – 4 February 1689 Jerusalem), grandson of Moshe Galante, was a 17th-century rabbi at Jerusalem. He served as the first Rishon Le'Zion and was called Magen (מגן) with reference to the initials of his name. Hezekiah da Silva was among his disciples.

He wrote Zebaḥ ha-Shelamim, a harmonisation of contradictory Biblical passages and of Biblical with Talmudical statements (edited by his grandson Moses Ḥagis, Amsterdam, 1707–08), and Ḳorban Ḥagigah, halakic and kabalistic novellæ (Venice, 1714).  Some of his responsa are found in the works of contemporaries, and a volume of his responsa exists under the title Elef ha-Magen, but has never been published (as of 1906).

See also
Galante (pedigree)

Jewish Encyclopedia bibliography
Steinschneider, Cat. Bodl. s.v.;
Azulai, Shem ha-Gedolim

References

1621 births
1689 deaths
17th-century rabbis in Jerusalem
Burials at the Jewish cemetery on the Mount of Olives
Sephardi rabbis in Ottoman Palestine